Fun 9 is the fourth studio album by Japanese musician Takako Minekawa. It was released on July 7, 1999 by Polystar. The album was released on November 16, 1999 in the United States by Emperor Norton Records.

The album's title is pronounced "fun-kyū", the latter half of the title referring to the Japanese equivalent of the numeral 9, and is intended to sound similar to the word "funk".

Critical reception

Heather Phares of AllMusic wrote that Minekawa had produced a "more eclectic and polished" record while retaining her "playful musical vision", "[fashioning] a wide array of lush, lighthearted songs into an album that is as self-assured as it is fun".

Drowned in Sound writer Samuel Rosean cited Fun 9 as a key Shibuya-kei release in a 2018 retrospective article. Tokyo Weekenders Ed Cunningham recommended Fun 9 to fans of Cornelius' album Fantasma (1997).

Track listing

Personnel
Credits are adapted from the album's liner notes.

Musicians
 Takako Minekawa – vocals, acoustic guitar, guitar, turntables, arrangement
 Craig Borrell – analog synthesizer, MTI Auto-Orchestra synthesizer, trumpet, turntables, vocals, backing vocals
 Michiko Endo – additional vocals on "Flow in a Tide", acoustic guitar on "Soft Graffiti"
 Ross Harris – analog synthesizer, bass, Boss SP-303 sampler, drum machine, guitar, turntables
 Toyoaki Misha – sound manipulation
 Keigo Oyamada – acoustic guitar, bass, drums, guitar, Stylophone keyboard, turntables
 Takahiro Unno – French horn on "Spin Spider Spin"

Production
 Takako Minekawa – production
 DJ Me DJ You – production
 Tadashi Matsuda – mixing, recording
 Michifumi Onodera – mixing
 Keigo Oyamada – production
 Tohru Takayama – mixing

References

External links
 

1999 albums
Takako Minekawa albums
Emperor Norton Records albums